This is a list of events in British radio during 1995.

Events

January
 January – As part of major changes on the network, old music (typically anything recorded before 1990) is banned from the Radio 1 daytime playlist.

February
 14 February – Talk Radio UK becomes the last of three national commercial radio stations to go on air. It broadcasts on the mediumwave frequencies previously occupied by Radio 1.

March
No events.

April
 10 April – Virgin Radio starts broadcasting on FM in London. The station is a full simulcast of the national service apart from a 45-minute weekday early evening program. Consequently, at around this time, the national station is rebranded from Virgin 1215 to Virgin Radio.
 15 April – BBC Radio 3 launches a weekly music discussion programme called Private Passions.
 21 April – Steve Wright and Bruno Brookes present their final shows for BBC Radio 1. Both had been at the station for more than ten years. Steve leaves the following differences with the station's new management over restructuring.
 23 April – Following Bruno Brookes’s departure, Mark Goodier begins his second stint as presenter of the Sunday afternoon Top 40 show.
 24 April – Chris Evans takes over the Radio 1 Breakfast Show from Steve Wright.

May
 May – BBC CWR closes as a stand-alone station and becomes an opt-out of BBC Radio WM.

June
No events.

July
No events.

August
Rather than merely broadcasting the usual mix of non-stop music and promos, Heart 106.2's test transmissions include live broadcasts of New York station WPLJ. The station launches on 5 September.

September
 27 September – The BBC begins regular Digital Audio Broadcasting, from the Crystal Palace transmitting station.

October
9 October – 
BBC Radio 3 begins broadcasting an hour earlier on weekdays with breakfast show On Air extended from two hours to three hours.
Paul Gambaccini joins Radio 3 to present a new morning program called Morning Collection. Consequently, This Week's Composer moves to the later time of 12noon.
21 October – Johnnie Walker ends his third and final stint at BBC Radio 1.

November
No events.

December
No events.

Unknown 
The roll-out of BBC Radio 1’s FM network is completed and the station now has the same coverage on FM as the other BBC national stations and having been known on-air as Radio 1 FM, or even simply as 1FM, since the start of the decade to promote the station's move to FM, the on-air name reverts to Radio 1.
Radio Harmony is rebranded as Kix 96 and changes frequency.

Station debuts
1 January –
Gemini FM and Gemini AM
Choice FM Birmingham
9 January – Tay AM
9 January – Tay FM
9 January – Northsound One
9 January – Northsound Two
 14 February – Talk Radio UK
 10 April – Virgin Radio 105.8
30 May – Radio XL
10 June – Premier Christian Radio
25 June – Vale FM
 3 July – Viva 963
 8 July – KMFM
 17 August – London Turkish Radio
 5 September – Heart 106.2
9 September – Sabras Sound
24 September – Amber Radio
30 September – 
CFM West Cumbria
Sound Wave
30 November – 103.2 Alpha Radio

Closing this year
Sunrise East Midlands (1992–1995)

Programme debuts
 5 January – In the Red on BBC Radio 4 (1995)
 20 February – Alan Parker on BBC Radio 1 (1995)
 February – Barrymore Plus Four on BBC Radio 4 (1995)
 15 April – Private Passions on BBC Radio 3 (1995–Present)
 19 April – Sunday Night at 10 on BBC Radio 2 (1995–2013)
 31 May – Any Other Business on BBC Radio 4 (1995)
 June – This Sceptred Isle on BBC Radio 4 (1995–1996 +Extensions)
 7 December – Change at Oglethorpe on BBC Radio 2 (1995–1996)

Continuing radio programmes

1940s
 Sunday Half Hour (1940–2018)
 Desert Island Discs (1942–Present)
 Letter from America (1946–2004)
 Woman's Hour (1946–Present)
 A Book at Bedtime (1949–Present)

1950s
 The Archers (1950–Present)
 The Today Programme (1957–Present)
 Sing Something Simple (1959–2001)
 Your Hundred Best Tunes (1959–2007)

1960s
 Farming Today (1960–Present)
 In Touch (1961–Present)
 The World at One (1965–Present)
 The Official Chart (1967–Present)
 Just a Minute (1967–Present)
 The Living World (1968–Present)
 The Organist Entertains (1969–2018)

1970s
 PM (1970–Present)
 Start the Week (1970–Present)
 Week Ending (1970–1998)
 You and Yours (1970–Present)
 I'm Sorry I Haven't a Clue (1972–Present)
 Good Morning Scotland (1973–Present)
 Kaleidoscope (1973–1998)
 Newsbeat (1973–Present)
 The News Huddlines (1975–2001)
 File on 4 (1977–Present)
 Money Box (1977–Present)
 The News Quiz (1977–Present)
 Breakaway (1979–1998)
 Feedback (1979–Present)
 The Food Programme (1979–Present)
 Science in Action (1979–Present)

1980s
 In Business (1983–Present)
 Sounds of the 60s (1983–Present)
 Loose Ends (1986–Present)

1990s
 The Moral Maze (1990–Present)
 Essential Selection (1991–Present)
 No Commitments (1992–2007)
 The Mark Steel Solution (1992–1996)
 The Masterson Inheritance (1993–1995)
 Harry Hill's Fruit Corner (1993–1997)
 The Pepsi Chart (1993–2002)
 Wake Up to Wogan (1993–2009)
 Essential Mix (1993–Present)
 Up All Night (1994–Present)
 Wake Up to Money (1994–Present)
 Collins and Maconie's Hit Parade (1994–1997)
 Julie Enfield Investigates (1994–1999)

Ending this year
 March – 
 Alan Parker (1995)
 Barrymore Plus Four (1995)
 July – Any Other Business on BBC Radio 4 (1995)
 20 December – Lee and Herring (1994–1995)
 25 December – The Masterson Inheritance (1993–1995)
 Unknown – Alan's Big One (1994–1995)

Deaths
 7 January – Larry Grayson, 71, comedian and presenter (Late Night Larry) 
 30 January – Gerald Durrell, 70, naturalist, zookeeper, author and broadcast presenter
 5 March – Vivian Stanshall, 51, comic singer-songwriter and broadcaster
 4 April – Kenny Everett, 50, radio disc jockey and broadcast entertainer
 18 August – Alan Dell, 71, BBC radio presenter
 4 November – Paul Eddington, 68, actor
 24 November – Stuart Henry, 54, DJ

See also
 1995 in British music
 1995 in British television
 1995 in the United Kingdom
 List of British films of 1995

References

Radio
British Radio, 1995 In
Years in British radio